Erik Sixten Viktor Fasth (born 8 August 1982) is a Swedish former professional ice hockey goaltender who last played for the Växjö Lakers of the Swedish Hockey League (SHL). Fasth had his international breakthrough during the 2010–11 season, after signing with Stockholm team AIK in the SHL.

Playing career

Division 2 to HockeyAllsvenskan
Viktor Fasth was born in Kalix, but grew up in Vänersborg. As an 18-year-old goaltender, Fasth played with the Brooklyn Tigers (a youth affiliate connected to Luleå HF) in the Swedish Division 2, the fourth-tier league. The following season he played with Vänersborgs HC in the third-tier league Division 1. The following season, in 2002–03, he turned to Tvåstad Cobras HC to return to Division 2. Tvåstad became promoted to Division 1 that season, and Fasth continued to play for them in the 2003–04 season. However, the Tvåstad Cobras HC team was shut down after the 2003–04 season due to financial problems, and Fasth therefore moved to play in Tingsryds AIF in Division 1 for three seasons. In his 2006–07 season with Tingsryd he was the third best goaltender in Division 1F, with a 92.47% save percentage in 33 games. His biggest success with the team came in that season, when he helped the team reach the Kvalserien qualification for HockeyAllsvenskan for the first time since their relegation to Division 1 in the 2002–03 season. However, the team finished fourth in the qualification and thus remained in Division 1.

Fasth then signed with Växjö Lakers Hockey in the 2007–08 season, at that time in the second-tier league HockeyAllsvenskan, and played there for three seasons. He played well in all of these seasons, placing, in save percentage, second in the 2007–08 season and first in the 2009–10 season.

Elitserien

After a successful 2009–10 season, which ended with play in the Kvalserien qualification for Sweden's top-tier league Elitserien (SHL), he signed a one-year contract with Elitserien newcomers AIK to make his debut season in Elitserien, the top ice hockey league in Sweden. He was set to be the team's backup goaltender, but injury problems for Christopher Heino-Lindberg forced AIK to start Viktor Fasth. Playing in 42 games, he posted an impressive 92.45% save percentage and placed third in the leading goaltenders league for save percentage. He significantly contributed to AIK's success that season, reaching the semifinals in the playoffs, where they were eliminated by Färjestad BK in four games. Viktor Fasth received both the Honken Trophy award and the Guldpucken (Golden Puck) award. In February 2011, Fasth extended his contract with the team by 2 years, which meant the contract was expected to expire after the 2012–13 season.

Fasth continued to impress in the 2011–12 season. Once again he finished third in save percentage at 93.14% and he was subsequently awarded the Honken Trophy for the second year in a row. In the playoffs, he continued to shut the door, and he and AIK managed to repeat the 2010–11 success, advancing to the semifinals, where they once again were eliminated, this time in seven games against Skellefteå AIK.

National Hockey League
On 21 May 2012, Fasth signed a 1-year, one-way $1 million USD deal with the Anaheim Ducks of the National Hockey League (NHL).

On 20 September 2012, due to the ongoing 2012–13 NHL lockout, Fasth signed to play with his former team Tingsryds AIF of the HockeyAllsvenskan (Swe-2). Fasth played in 12 games for the team, registering an impressive 94.17% save percentage and a 1.68 goals against average (GAA).

In his NHL debut on 26 January 2013, Fasth led the Ducks to a 3–2 shootout victory over the Nashville Predators. Fasth stopped 19 of the 21 shots sent his way, and prevented the Predators from finding the net in the shootout with Martin Erat hitting the crossbar, Fasth stopping Mike Fisher's shot, and then swatting the puck out of the air from David Legwand. Corey Perry scored the game-winning goal for the Ducks in the shootout. Fasth found early success in the NHL, starting the season 8–0–0 – the best start by a goaltender in the regular season as a starter since Ray Emery of the Ottawa Senators won his first nine games between the end of 2002–03 and the beginning of the 2003–04 season. Fasth eventually ended the streak in his ninth start on 25 February 2013, with a 2–5 loss against the Los Angeles Kings on the road, also ending a six-game winning streak for the Ducks. With the loss, Fasth failed to match Ray Emery's streak. Fasth further helped the Ducks advance to an 11–2–1 record, their best start since their Stanley Cup-winning 2006–07 season. Fasth finished the regular season with a 15–6–2 record; the Ducks finished with a 30–12–6 record and qualified for the 2013 Stanley Cup playoffs. The Ducks were eliminated in the Conference Quarterfinals by the Detroit Red Wings in seven games, with Fasth not playing in any of these games as the backup to Jonas Hiller.

The following year, Fasth was injured early in the season. On 4 March 2014, Fasth was traded by the Ducks to the Edmonton Oilers in exchange for a fifth and a third round pick in the 2014 and 2015 NHL Entry Draft, respectively. This gave him the chance to compete for the number one job against goalie Ben Scrivens.

Kontinental Hockey League
On 9 July 2015, Fasth agreed to terms on an initial one-year contract with CSKA Moscow of the Kontinental Hockey League (KHL). Fasth provided an immediate stability to CSKA and was extended for a further season. Over his two seasons in the KHL with CSKA, Fasth won 28 of his 41 games.

Return to Sweden
As a free agent following the 2016–17 season, Fasth opted to return to his homeland and agreed to a second stint with Växjö Lakers, who were promoted to the SHL in his absence from leaving the club in 2010. He signed a three-year contract on May 1, 2017.

International play

After goaltender Stefan Liv declined playing for Sweden in the 2011 World Championship, Fasth was given a chance to play for the Swedish national team. Fasth made his debut for Sweden on 6 April 2011, in an exhibition game against Germany. In the World Championship tournament he helped Sweden reach the final and led the leading goaltenders league until the gold medal game against Finland. However, Sweden lost the final and Fasth allowed 6 goals out of 32 shots in that game, and Fasth therefore landed second in the leading goaltenders league, with a 94.57% save percentage in 7 games and three shutouts, as well as a 1.71 GAA. Despite the loss, Fasth was named the tournament's MVP (most valuable player) and best goaltender. He was also selected to the tournament's All-Star Team.

At the 2012 World Championship, Fasth was once again the starting goaltender for the Swedish national team. However, Sweden was eliminated in the quarterfinal against the Czech Republic. In 6 games, Fasth recorded a 90.21% save percentage and a 2.34 GAA; he placed 11th in the save percentage rankings.

Personal life
Fasth is the son of Kenteric Fasth, a former goaltender who played for IFK Vänersborg in the then third-tier Division 2. Fasth lives with his wife Linda Bäcktorp. Linda gave birth to a daughter in July 2011.

Career statistics

Regular season and playoffs

International

Awards and honours

References

External links

1982 births
Living people
AIK IF players
Anaheim Ducks players
Edmonton Oilers players
Expatriate ice hockey players in Russia
HC CSKA Moscow players
Norfolk Admirals players
Ice hockey players at the 2018 Winter Olympics
Olympic ice hockey players of Sweden
People from Kalix Municipality
People from Vänersborg Municipality
Swedish expatriate ice hockey players in Canada
Swedish expatriate ice hockey players in the United States
Swedish ice hockey goaltenders
Tingsryds AIF players
Undrafted National Hockey League players
Växjö Lakers players
Sportspeople from Västra Götaland County